Dion Carlos Choi (born 6 February 1999) is a Macanese footballer who currently plays as an midfielder for Benfica (Macau) and the Macau national football team.

Career statistics

Club

Notes

International

References

1999 births
Living people
Macau footballers
Macau international footballers
Association football midfielders
C.D. Monte Carlo players
S.L. Benfica de Macau players
Liga de Elite players